Chashma may refer to:

 Chashma, Iran, a village in Iran
 Chashma, Kyrgyzstan, a town in Kyrgyzstan
 Chashma, Mianwali, a city in Pakistan
 Chashma Nuclear Power Plant, Pakistan
 Chashma, Tajikistan
 , a religious site in Nurota, Uzbekistan

See also 
 Cheshma (disambiguation)